The 2022 Lithuanian Football Cup, for sponsorship reasons also called  is a single elimination football tournament in Lithuania. The winner of the competition earns a spot in the first qualifying round of the 2023–24 UEFA Europa Conference League.

Having had participants numbers limited to the first three tiers for the last two years, this year's tournament was open to clubs from any division. As before, the "B" teams do not participate in the cup competition. The A lyga teams entered the tournament from the second round this year. A total number of participants this year was 54: 10 A lyga clubs, 11 LFF I lyga clubs, 11 LFF II lyga clubs, 17 LFF III lyga clubs and 5 SFL clubs.

Draw and match calendar

Round I

Round of 32

Round of 16

Quarterfinals

Semifinals

Final

See also
 2022 A Lyga

References

External links
 Lietuvos Futbolas
 Lithuanian Football Federation

Lithuanian Football Cup seasons
Seasons in Lithuanian football
Lithuania
Lithuania